Ho Technical University, formerly Ho Polytechnic, is a public tertiary institution in the Volta Region of Ghana. The Polytechnic started in 1968 as a technical institute with the primary goal of providing pre-technical education. By 1972, the Institute made tremendous progress and upgraded its courses. In 1986, the institution was upgraded into a Polytechnic. However, it was not until 1993 that it got full backing of the law (Polytechnic Law 321) to become a fully-fledged tertiary institution, charged with the responsibility of training students to the Higher National Diploma (HND) and Degree Levels.

Strategic Plan
The University has its antecedents in the former Ho Technical Institute, which was established in 1968 to provide pre-technical training courses in various engineering and building trades. In 1972, the pre-technical courses were upgraded to more advanced programmes in technical, business and other vocational disciplines.

Though the Technical Institute was re-designated a Polytechnic in 1986, it was not until 1993 that it got the full backing of the law (PNDC Law 321 as amended by ACT 745) to become a tertiary institution with statutory objectives and functions.

Academic 
The University offers Master of Technology (MTech) Programmes , Bachelor of Technology (BTech) Programmes, Higher National Diploma (HND) and Non-Tertiary Programmes.

Master of Technology (MTech) Programmes are affiliated to the Kwame Nkrumah University of Science and Technology (KNUST) on sandwich basis. The programme is run for over a period of two (2) academic sessions.

Notable alumni

 Maureen Abla Amematekpor, former Ghana Ambassador to Namibia and Botswana

References
https://htu.edu.gh/index.php

Polytechnics in Ghana
Education in Volta Region